is a Japanese tarento. She is represented with Stardust Promotion.

Filmography

Variety

Current

Former

TV dramas

Radio

Films

Stage

Advertisements

Bibliography

References

External links
 
 
Coupii Art Shinzen Taishi (Moe Yamaguchi) 

Japanese female idols
Japanese television personalities
Actresses from Tokyo
Stardust Promotion artists
Seijo University alumni
1977 births
Living people